The Ministry of the Interior of the Czech Republic is a government ministry tasked with responsibilities in public and internal security, citizenship, identity cards and social security numbers, as well as travel, border, immigration control and civil service among others. The ministry has under its jurisdiction police, Office for Foreign Relations and Information (ÚZSI), fire department and Czech Post.

The current Minister of the Interior is Vít Rakušan, in office since 17 December 2021.

Responsibilities 
 internal security
 citizenship, identity cards, social security numbers
 public archives and collections
 firearms regulation
 fire services 
 travel, border, immigration control

See also 
 Law enforcement in the Czech Republic
 Police of the Czech Republic
 Crime in the Czech Republic
 Human trafficking in the Czech Republic
 Gun politics in the Czech Republic

External links

Czech Republic
Interior
Ministries established in 1969
1969 establishments in Czechoslovakia